The jazz trio album Dedications was recorded by pianist Toshiko Akiyoshi in Los Angeles in July 1976 and was released by Discomate Records in Japan.   This recording is not to be confused with the 1977 Inner City Records (USA) release of the same name, Dedications, which was also released by Discomate in Japan, but under the title Dedications II.

Track listing
LP side A
"I Let a Song Go Out of My Heart" (Ellington) – 4:21
"Miss Blue Eyes" (Mariano) – 5:45
"Django" (Lewis) – 6:05
"Rio" (Feather) – 3:53
LP side B
"Wind" (Watanabe) – 6:01
"Reets and I" (Harris) – 4:42
"Don't Be Afraid, The Clown's Afraid Too" (Mingus) – 5:34
"Let The Tape Roll" (Tabackin) – 3:09

Personnel
Toshiko Akiyoshi – piano
Jimmie Smith – drums
Gene Cherico – bass

References / external links
Discomate DSP-5001
Alfa Records (Japan) ALCR-161

Toshiko Akiyoshi albums
1976 albums